Martin is a village in southeastern Allegan County in the U.S. state of Michigan. The population was 410 at the 2010 census.

Geography

Demographics

2010 census
As of the census of 2010, there were 410 people, 162 households, and 109 families living in the village. The racial makeup of the village was 92.9% White, 1.0% African American, 2.9% from other races, and 3.2% from two or more races. Hispanic or Latino of any race were 5.9% of the population.

There were 162 households, of which 31.5% had children under the age of 18 living with them, 52.5% were married couples living together, 10.5% had a female householder with no husband present, 4.3% had a male householder with no wife present, and 32.7% were non-families. 27.8% of all households were made up of individuals, and 10.5% had someone living alone who was 65 years of age or older. The average household size was 2.53 and the average family size was 3.06.

The median age in the village was 37.8 years. 24.9% of residents were under the age of 18; 11% were between the ages of 18 and 24; 23.8% were from 25 to 44; 26.9% were from 45 to 64; and 13.4% were 65 years of age or older. The gender makeup of the village was 50.7% male and 49.3% female.

2000 census
As of the census of 2000, there were 435 people, 172 households, and 126 families living in the village. The racial makeup of the village was 95.86% White, 0.46% African American, 0.92% Native American, 0.46% Asian, 2.30% from other races. Hispanic or Latino of any race were 2.76% of the population.

There were 172 households, out of which 33.1% had children under the age of 18 living with them, 57.6% were married couples living together, 11.0% had a female householder with no husband present, and 26.2% were non-families. 21.5% of all households were made up of individuals, and 9.3% had someone living alone who was 65 years of age or older.  The average household size was 2.53 and the average family size was 2.92.

In the village, the population was spread out, with 28.0% under the age of 18, 10.1% from 18 to 24, 26.2% from 25 to 44, 20.0% from 45 to 64, and 15.6% who were 65 years of age or older.  The median age was 36 years. For every 100 females, there were 103.3 males.  For every 100 females age 18 and over, there were 95.6 males.

The median income for a household in the village was $41,389, and the median income for a family was $48,958. Males had a median income of $40,000 versus $28,929 for females. The per capita income for the village was $16,238.  About 6.4% of families and 9.6% of the population were below the poverty line, including 14.1% of those under age 18 and none of those age 65 or over.

Points of interest
US-131 Motorsports Park, originally known as Martin Dragway, claims to be "The fastest track in Michigan".

External links
 Village of Martin
 Aviva Directory: Martin

References

Villages in Allegan County, Michigan
Villages in Michigan